The 2002 season of the 3. divisjon, the fourth highest association football league for men in Norway.

22 games were played in 24 groups, with three points given for a win and one point for a draw. Twelve teams were promoted to the 2. divisjon through playoff.

Tables 

Group 1
Sarpsborg – lost playoff
Sparta
Årvoll (-> Groruddalen BK)
Hellerud
Fredrikstad 2
Råde
Skeid 2
Kvik Halden 2
Grüner
Ullern
Borgen – relegated
Vestli – relegated

Group 2
Borg Fotball – won playoff
Østsiden
Fagerborg
Rakkestad
Vålerenga 2
Kolbotn
Oppegård
Selbak
Oslo Øst 2
Lisleby
Torp
Rolvsøy – relegated

Group 3
Mercantile – won playoff
Trøgstad/Båstad
KFUM
Moss 2
Drøbak/Frogn
Follo 2
Spydeberg
Greåker
Bækkelaget
Nordstrand
Rygge – relegated
Skjeberg – relegated

Group 4
Grei – lost playoff
Fossum
Grorud
Bjerke
Lørenskog 2
Nittedal
Røa
Focus
Fjellhamar
Kjelsås 2
Rælingen
Holmen – relegated

Group 5
Lillestrøm 2 – won playoff
Sander
Strømmen
Funnefoss/Vormsund
Galterud
Grue
Sørumsand
Aurskog/Finstadbru
Skjetten 2
Kongsvinger 2
Høland
Eidskog – relegated

Group 6
Brumunddal – lost playoff
Lom
Ham-Kam 2
Vang
Trysil
Follebu
Fart
Hamar
Ringebu/Fåvang
Ringsaker
Elverum 2 – relegated
Kvam – relegated

Group 7
Gjøvik-Lyn – won playoff
Vardal
Hønefoss BK 2
Raufoss 2
Jevnaker
SAFK Fagernes
Toten
Kolbu/KK
Vind
Søndre Land
FF Lillehammer 2 – relegated
Lunner – relegated

Group 8
Mjøndalen – lost playoff
Asker
Birkebeineren
Eik-Tønsberg
Flint
Åssiden
Falk
Ørn-Horten 2
Borre
Skiold
Tønsberg FK – relegated
Slemmestad – relegated

Group 9
Strømsgodset 2
Runar – won playoff
Larvik Turn
Åmot
Stokke
Teie
Vestfossen
Tjølling
Hønefoss SK
Larvik Fotball 2
Siljan – relegated
Kongsberg – relegated

Group 10
Odd Grenland 2 – won playoff
Pors Grenland 2
Trauma
Skotfoss
Notodden
Urædd
Langesund/Stathelle
Brevik
Seljord
Drangedal
Herkules – relegated

Group 11

FK Arendal – lost playoff
Lyngdal
Vindbjart
Vigør
Flekkerøy
Våg
Donn
Flekkefjord
Start 2
Søgne
Rygene – relegated
Kvinesdal – relegated

Group 12
Ålgård – won playoff
Sandnes FK
Eiger
Hundvåg
Bryne 2
Egersund
Hana
Staal
Figgjo
Sola
Havørn – relegated
Orre – relegated

Group 13
Vaulen – lost playoff
Åkra
Haugesund 2
Vardeneset
Kopervik
Ulf-Sandnes
Buøy
Torvastad
Vedavåg Karmøy
Randaberg
Grannekameratene – relegated
Tasta – relegated

Group 14
Trott – lost playoff
Lyngbø
Stord/Moster
Os
Trio
Ny-Krohnborg
Gneist
Hald
Sandviken
Bremnes
Bergen Nord
Djerv – relegated

Group 15
Hovding – won playoff
Askøy
Follese
Radøy/Manger
Vadmyra
Varegg
Voss
Austevoll
Arna-Bjørnar
Trane
Osterøy – relegated
Nymark – relegated

Group 16
Jotun – lost playoff
Stryn
Sogndal 2
Høyang
Sandane
Saga
Fjøra
Florø
Dale – relegated
Eid – relegated
Årdalstangen/Lærdal – relegated
Jølster – relegated

Group 17
Bergsøy – lost playoff
Volda
Aalesund 2
Ørsta
Brattvåg
Ha/No
Hareid
Velledalen og Ringen – relegated
Stordal
Stranda – relegated
Vigra – relegated
Ellingsøy – relegated

Group 18
Averøykameratene – won playoff
Sunndal
Bryn
Gossen
Midsund
Surnadal
Molde 3
Kristiansund
Åndalsnes
Ekko/Aureosen – relegated
Bud
Dahle/Clausenengen 2

Group 19
Nardo – lost playoff
Kolstad
Ranheim
Tynset
Orkla
Rissa
Flå
Løkken – relegated
Buvik
Melhus
Byåsen 2 – relegated
Tiller – relegated

Group 20
Nidelv – won playoff
Namsos
Stjørdals-Blink
NTNUI
Selbu
Malvik
Strindheim 2
Beitstad
Rørvik
Vinne
Bangsund – relegated
Kvik – relegated

Group 21
Steigen – lost playoff
Innstranden
Fauske/Sprint
Mosjøen
Bodø/Glimt 2
Stålkameratene
Brønnøysund
Tverlandet – relegated
Nesna
Sandnessjøen
Nordre Meløy
Leirfjord – relegated

Group 22
Narvik – won playoff
Grovfjord
Melbo
Morild
Ballstad
Skånland
Leknes
Bjerkvik
Ballangen
Medkila
Beisfjord – relegated
Høken – relegated

Group 23
Lyngen/Karnes – lost playoff
Ramfjord
Finnsnes
Senja
Tromsø 2
Fløya
Tromsdalen 2
Nordreisa
Bardu
Ringvassøy – relegated
Kvaløysletta – relegated
Nordkjosbotn – relegated

Group 24
Bossekop – won playoff
Porsanger
Kautokeino
Kirkenes
Tverrelvdalen
Honningsvåg
Båtsfjord
Nordkinn
Polarstjernen
Rafsbotn
Nordlys
Nerskogen – relegated

Playoffs

References
NIFS

Norwegian Third Division seasons
4
Norway
Norway